Alkanibacter is a Gram-negative genus of bacteria from the family of Sinobacteraceae with one known species (Fontimonas thermophila). Alkanibacter difficilis has been isolated from a hexane degrading biofilter in Hamm in Germany.

References

Gammaproteobacteria
Bacteria genera
Monotypic bacteria genera